The North Island takahē (Porphyrio mantelli) is an extinct rail that was found in the North Island of New Zealand. This flightless species is known from subfossils from a number of archeological sites and from one possible 1894 record (Phillipps, 1959). It appeared to have been even larger than the South Island takahē and, if it did survive until the 1890s, would have been the largest rail in historic times.
The decline of the species has generally been attributed to the increasing incursion of forest into the alpine grasslands through the Holocene, although hunting by the Māori also played a major role.

Traditionally the North Island takahē was considered conspecific with the endangered South Island takahē P. hochstetteri. Trewick (1996) presented evidence that the two taxa were independently derived from flying ancestors, so proved to be separate species.

The binomial of this bird commemorates the naturalist and civil servant Walter Mantell.

References

 Phillipps, W. J. (1959): The Last (?) Occurrence of Notornis in the North Island. Notornis 8(4): 93–94. 
 Trewick, S. A. (1996): Morphology and evolution of two takahe: flightless rails of New Zealand. J. Zool. 238: 221–237.
 Worthy, Trevor H. & Holdaway R. N. (2002): The lost world of the Moa: Prehistoric Life of New Zealand. Indiana University Press, Bloomington. .

External links

North Island Takahe - BirdLife Species Factsheet

North Island takahē
Birds of the North Island
Extinct flightless birds
Bird extinctions since 1500
Late Quaternary prehistoric birds
Extinct birds of New Zealand
North Island takahē